The University of Akureyri (regionally also ) was founded in 1987 in the town of Akureyri in the northeastern part of Iceland. It is today a school of health sciences, humanities and social science, and a school of business and science. Over 2000 students attended the university in the autumn semester of 2014, around half of them through flexible learning, making the university the largest provider of distance education in the country. The University of Akureyri coordinates with other Icelandic Universities to operate the University Centre of the Westfjords (Háskólasetur Vestfjarða) located in Ísafjörður, which operates two master's degrees, one in Coastal and Marine Management and the other in Marine Innovation. Additionally, The University of Akureyri coordinates with other Nordic Universities for the West Nordic Studies and Polar Law Masters programs.

History
The University was established in 1987 when the health sciences and industrial management studies began. The first rector was Haraldur Bessason. Staff were four people in total and the number of students 31. Two classrooms in the local sports center were used as classrooms. In 1988, the library was officially added to the school. Two months after the library was added, the Student Center opened. The first class to graduate was in 1989, and consisted of 10 industrial management students. On January 4, 1990, the Faculty of Fisheries was established. The first master's degree students graduated February 26, 2000. These students pursued a master's degree in nursing. A new chancellor took over from Þorsteinn Gunnarsson on July 1, 2009 after 15 years in office, Stefán B. Sigurðsson.

Campus

The main building, called Sólborg is a series of interconnected sections built in numerous phases since 1967. The University received its current residence in 1995. A new research and development building called Borgir was opened in 2004.

Teaching is conducted in two buildings at the University of Akureyri campus (Norðurslóð) called Sólborg and Borgir. The university campus area is centrally located in Akureyri.

Other facilities include a cafeteria, and a wellness and exercise centre.

Library
The university library is located at Sólborg, where there are facilities for reading and computer use. It is a research library and it tailors its purchases of material mostly according to the requirements of the University faculties and the research conducted at the University. Students have access to the reading rooms at all hours.

Schools and Faculties
School of Humanities and Social Sciences (Hug- og félagsvísindasvið)

Faculty of Social Science:
BA Media Studies
BA Modern Studies
BA Psychology
BA Social Sciences
BA Police Science
Diploma in Police Science for active police officers
Diploma in Police Science for prospective police officers

Faculty of Education:
Bachelors in Education
Masters in Education

Faculty of Law:
BA Law
Law Certificates
Graduate Diploma-Law
Master's degree Program leading to an LL.M. degree
Master's degree Program leading to MA degree

School of Health Sciences (Heilbrigðisvísindasvið)

Faculty of Occupational Therapy:
BS Occupational Therapy

Faculty of Nursing:
Nursing Program

School of Business and Science (Viðskipta- og raunvísindasvið)

Faculty of Natural Resource Sciences:
BS Biotechnology
BS Fisheries Science
MS Natural Resource Sciences
MRM in Coastal & Marine Management (Program located in Ísafjörður through the University Centre of the Westfjords)

Faculty of Business Administration:
BS Business Administration

Polar Law and West Nordic Studies

The University of Akureyri's established Polar Law masters programmes are now offered in cooperation with four other Universities within the West Nordic Studies, Governance and Sustainable Management interdisciplinary masters programme. Students from all the affiliated masters programmes will attend a joint first course, Introduction to Circumpolar Studies, in Akureyri in August 2015. Students continue their studies at their home institution but those following the West Nordic Studies study line will take at least one term's coursework from a partner university. In addition to the coursework, all students complete a substantial thesis.

The University of Akureyri's partner universities are the University of the Faroe Islands, the University of Greenland, the University of Iceland and the University of Nordland.

Polar Law

The University of Akureyri offers the following studies in Polar Law: a 120 ECTS programme leading to an MA degree; a 90 ECTS programme leading to an LL.M. degree; a 60 ECTS study at master level leading to a Graduate diploma; and individual courses in Polar law leading to a certificate. All courses in Polar Law are taught in English.

International cooperation: The Polar Law Programmes are incorporated within the International West Nordic Studies Masters Programme. This is a cooperative Programme with the University of the Faroe Islands, the University of Greenland, the University of Nordland and the University of Iceland.

In addition to these partner institutes, The Polar Law Programme at the University of Akureyri involves experts from the University of Lapland, the University of Tilburg, the University of Tromso, the University of Tasmania, Vrije Universiteit Brussel, the Arctic Council and the Stefansson Arctic Institute.

Programme description: The programme provides a unique focus on Polar law. It comes about in a timely fashion, when climate changes are having a dramatic effect on the Arctic and Antarctic, when the opening of new shipping routes is becoming probable, when current and potential boundary disputes on land and sea remain unresolved, when issues and questions of national and local governance are moving forward on national and international agendas, and, last but not least, when multiple threats to the environment are sending serious danger-signals and calling for urgent measures. One of the interesting areas of study to which this program can contribute concerns possible lessons that the legal regime for Antarctica could provide for solutions in the Arctic.

Polar Law describes the legal regimes applicable to the Arctic and the Antarctic. It is interdisciplinary, placing emphasis on relevant areas of public international law and social sciences. Subject areas include: environmental law; the law of the sea; sovereignty issues and boundary disputes on land and sea; natural resources governance; the rights of indigenous peoples in the North; self-government and good governance; economic development; Arctic security and Arctic strategies; and land and resource claims in Polar regions.

Examples of courses within the Polar Law program:
Antarctic Law and Policy
Public International Law
The Rights of Indigenous People
Environmental Law and Biodiversity

West Nordic Studies

West Nordic Studies: Governance and Sustainable Management is a multidisciplinary Master's Programme (120 ECTS) in West Nordic Studies offered jointly by the partner universities. The programme aims to provide specific knowledge of the Circumpolar North, combined with abilities to manage and link contemporary issues and past developments on orientation in the major themes of the present debate on societal challenges. The objective is to increase knowledge of the common issues of the area. The aim is to graduate candidates that can understand and meet the complicated challenges of coastal Norway, Iceland, Greenland and the Faroe Islands (the Nora region) as part of the Circumpolar North complexities and are able to strengthen networking in the area. WNS will offer a comparative perspective in meeting the urgent challenges the region is facing today including the social implications of climate change affecting scarce populations and micro-economies; long distances; limited working opportunities; gender issues in society and education; threats to indigenous culture and societal security; contested issues of identity and cultural heritage; the quest for natural resources; good governance and sustainable management.

The programme includes studies in WNS home universities, joint intensive course at the University of Akureyri, studies completed at other partner universities and a Master's thesis. WNS studies can be completed in four semesters. Each WNS student is required to complete at least 30 ECTS credits at another partner university abroad. The length of the study abroad period can vary according to the student's individual study plan.

Research
Most research is done by academic members of the staff in the university's Research and Development Center. In addition, there are other research institutes:
Research and Development Centre of UNAK
Research Centre on Children's Literature
Research Centre for Health Science at UNAK
The Icelandic Tourism Research Centre
Centre of School Development at UNAK
Research Centre Against Violence
Fisheries Science Centre

Arctic Issues

UNAK's policy emphasizes on being progressive in teaching and research that meets international standards. Emphasis is placed on teaching and research related to Icelandic society and economy, as well as fields related to Arctic issues.

UNAK is an international university where standards of research and teaching are international. UNAK emphasizes greatly on the importance to cooperate with universities in the North and is one of the founding members of the University of the Arctic, collaborative network of universities in the North. The University of the Arctic links together universities and organizes student exchange program (North2North), thematic networks, joint degree etc. UNAK's policy with the emphasis on Arctic issues has created uniqueness for the university which is now both domestically and abroad recognized for teaching and research in disciplines related to the North.

The University of Akureyri is also a founding partner of the Icelandic Arctic Cooperation Network.
The main purpose of The Icelandic Arctic Cooperation Network is to increase the visibility and understanding of the Arctic and activities working towards the northern Iceland. The CEO of the network, Embla Eir Oddsdóttir, has for many years worked on projects and studies relating to the Arctic.

Conferences

The University of Akureyri Research and Development Centre (RHA) offers services for organizing conferences, meetings or conventions in partnership with professionals. RHA has good experience in organizing such events both domestically and abroad.

External Relations

International Students
Each year the school receives many exchange students. These students come through one of four exchange programs:
Nordplus
Erasmus
North2North
Bilateral agreement between universities
Through these programs, students can come as guest students. This occurs when a student attends the university for a short period of time, but there is no formal co-operation between universities. Not only do students travel, but so do teachers. Through the Erasmus program, teachers have travelled to co-operating universities and given lectures. This exchange of teachers has taken place in many countries including: the United Kingdom, Denmark, Latvia, Germany, Italy, Sweden, Austria, Belgium, and France.

Agreement with Western Kentucky University

Western Kentucky University (WKU), the University of Akureyri (UNAK) and the Icelandic Arctic Cooperation Network (IACN) signed an academic and research agreement that solidifies the North Atlantic Climate Change Collaboration (NAC3) project.

The innovative agreement signed by the academic and research partners will center on academic exchanges and joint course offerings, research initiatives, capacity building, economic development activities, and service-learning. The NAC3 project aims to focus on academic exchange, course development and collaborative research in the areas of climate change, climate literacy, health and wellness, ocean dynamics, sustainability, informal public education, economic development, technology exchange, and water resources, among others. (Additional information about the project is available at www.wku.edu/iceland)

University Centre of the Westfjords

The University Centre, also known as Háskólasetur Vestfjarða in Icelandic was founded at the University level in 2005 in Ísafjörður. The Centre employees 10 full-time permanent staff members as well as hosting 50 members of staff for research and teaching. The University Centre operates distance learning for 100 students in the Westfjords region of Iceland as well as two master's degrees programs, them being Coastal and Marine Management and Marine Innovation. In addition to these programs, the Centre hosts a variety of summer Icelandic courses. Programs at the University Centre, particularly the Coastal & Marine Management program have been increasingly attracting a diverse group of international students. In 2010, 120 applicants applied, 45 were accepted and 20 enrolled. 14 percent of these students were Icelandic and the others from a variety of other countries. The number of applicants for the program has been rising since.

Coastal and Marine Management

Coastal and Marine Management is a demanding and ambitious master's program in environmental and resource management. T he program is cross-disciplinary and prepares students for diverse positions in both the public and private sectors. The program emphasizes management and each course involves an interdisciplinary approach. Emphasis is placed on solving real life problems. The programme emphasises ideas and methods from ecology, sociology, economics and business studies. Students completing the programme have knowledge of the diverse and valuable resources of the coast and the sea, understand their current condition, and have gathered tools and expertise to drive the sustainable use of marine resources. The course language, including all teaching, is English. The University Centre of the Westfjords offers this programme in co-operation with the University of Akureyri. Teaching takes place in Ísafjörður. Students graduate from the University of Akureyri with an MRM degree (Master of Resource Management), with coastal and marine management as a specialty.

Students complete 8 core courses and up to 12 electives. The core course are :
Scientific Methods and Research Practices
Principles of Planning
Integrated Coastal Zone Management: Introduction and Theory
Understanding the Ocean
Applied Methodology
Physical Processes of Coastal and
Marine Environment
Economics and Policy
Integrated Coastal Zone Management: Practical Applications and
Challenges

Students can choose from a number of electives to fulfill the taught part of the program, including but not limited to:
Leadership and Management in Changing Times
Marine Protected Area Management
Coastal and Underwater Heritage
Coastal and Marine Spatial Planning
Managing Coastal and Offshore Emergencies
Pollution in the Coastal Arctic
Evaluating Sustainable Fisheries
Environmental Certification and Eco-labeling Schemes
Law of the Sea
Geographical Information Systems
Innovation and Sustainability in Aquaculture
Fishing Technology
Communicating Climate Change
Adaption Planning
Conflict Resolution in Ocean Management
Marine Renewable Energy

Among the fields which the master's program in Coastal and Marine Management prepares students to work in are resource and land use planning, environmental impact assessment, consulting work, teaching and research. The program is internationally oriented and taught in English, and both students and instructors come from a diverse range of countries. The master's program in Coastal and Marine Management brings together people of different backgrounds who share their experience, knowledge, and ideas in a small-scale, creative and fertile intellectual environment, with the goal of finding ways of using natural resources in a sustainable way.

Marine Innovation

The professional master's program in Marine Innovation is an unconventional program offered in cooperation with the University of Akureyri and the Innovation Centre Iceland, where students learn to make a job instead of taking one. We define marine innovation in a wide sense, covering everything from fisheries, aquaculture, and food production, to technical solutions and energy production, as well as tourism and culture.

The program gives students insight into coastal and marine issues and the nature and conditions of starting and running an innovative micro-business. Each student designs an individually-tailored plan of study, combining courses in their professional field and business management courses with the respective innovative project. Students work closely with the Innovation Centre Iceland and the Westfjords economy. Because the program is individually structured the number of students is limited.

By completing the program students will be well-prepared to execute their own ideas; whether it is by founding a new business or within an established business. These skills are also valuable in the labor market in general, in fields such as project managing, strategic planning and decision making for example. In this sense the program provides students with excellent skills that are useful in the ever-changing modern labor market that demands independent work methods, innovative spirit and self-discipline.

See also
 Skemman.is (digital library)

References

External links
 Official Website (in Icelandic and English)

University of Akureyri
University of Akureyri
Educational institutions established in 1987
1987 establishments in Iceland